Mount Alderson is a  summit located in Waterton Lakes National Park, in the Canadian Rockies of Alberta, Canada. Its nearest higher peak is Mount Custer,  to the southwest.

History

Mount Alderson was named for Sir Edwin Alfred Hervey Alderson, a senior British Army officer who served in several campaigns of the late nineteenth and early twentieth centuries, ultimately in command of the Canadian Corps in World War I. The mountain's name was officially adopted in 1943 by the Geographical Names Board of Canada.

Geology

Like other mountains in Waterton Lakes National Park, Mount Alderson is composed of sedimentary rock laid down during the Precambrian to Jurassic periods. Formed in shallow seas, this sedimentary rock was pushed east and over the top of younger Cretaceous period rock during the Laramide orogeny.

Climate

Based on the Köppen climate classification, Mount Alderson is located in a subarctic climate with cold, snowy winters, and mild summers. Temperatures can drop below −20 °C with wind chill factors below −30 °C. Precipitation runoff from Mount Alderson drains into Waterton Lake,  thence Waterton River.

See also

Geology of Alberta
Geography of Alberta

References

External links
 Parks Canada web site: Waterton Lakes National Park

Canadian Rockies
Two-thousanders of Alberta